Thylacodes is a genus of sea snails, marine gastropod mollusks in the family Vermetidae, the worm snails or worm shells. The species in this genus were previously placed in the genus Serpulorbis.

Unlike some other vermetids, the species in this genus have no operculum.

Like other vermetids, the species in this genus do not have regular shell coiling like that of a typical gastropod shell, instead they have shells which are irregular. They are usually cemented onto a hard surface. Because of all this, the shells resemble the calcareous tubes of worms in the polychaete family Serpulidae.

Species
Species within the genus Thylacodes include:

Thylacodes adamsii (Mörch, 1859)
Thylacodes aotearoicus (J. E. Morton, 1951)
Thylacodes arenarius (Linnaeus, 1758)
Thylacodes aureus (Hughes, 1978)
 Thylacodes borshenglyuhrurngae K.-Y. Lai, 2018
Thylacodes capensis (Thiele, 1925)
Thylacodes colubrinus (Röding, 1798)
Thylacodes constrictor (Mörch, 1862)
Thylacodes daidai (Scheuwimmer & Nishiwaki, 1982)
Thylacodes decussatus (Gmelin, 1791)
Thylacodes dentiferus (Lamarck, 1818)
Thylacodes eruciformis (Mörch, 1862)
Thylacodes grandis (Gray, 1842)
Thylacodes hadfieldi (Kelly, 2007)
Thylacodes inopertus (Leuckart in Rüppell & Leuckart, 1828)
Thylacodes lamarckii (Vaillant, 1871)
Thylacodes longifilis (Mörch, 1862)
Thylacodes lornensis (Marwick, 1926) †
Thylacodes margaritaceus (Rousseau in Chenu, 1844)
Thylacodes masier (Deshayes, 1843)
Thylacodes medusae (Pilsbry, 1891)
Thylacodes megalostomus (Mörch, 1865)
Thylacodes natalensis (Mörch, 1862)
Thylacodes nodosorugosus (Lischke, 1869)
Thylacodes novaehollandiae (Rousseau in Chenu, 1843)
Thylacodes ophioides (P. Marshall & R. Murdoch, 1921) †
Thylacodes oryzatus (Mörch, 1862)
Thylacodes peronii (Rousseau in Chenu, 1844)
Thylacodes riisei (Mörch, 1862)
Thylacodes roussaei (Vaillant, 1871)
Thylacodes sipho (Lamarck, 1818)
Thylacodes squamigerus (Carpenter, 1857)
Thylacodes squamolineatus (Petuch, 2002)
Thylacodes sutilis (Mörch, 1862)
Thylacodes trimeresurus (Shikama & Horikoshi, 1963)
Thylacodes vandyensis (Bieler et al., 2017) 
Thylacodes variabilis (Hadfield & Kay, 1972)
Thylacodes varidus (Okutani & Habe, 1975)
Thylacodes xenophorus (Habe, 1961)
Thylacodes yokojima (Shikama, 1977)
Thylacodes zelandicus (Quoy & Gaimard, 1834)

Synonyms
 Thylacodes angulatus (Rousseau in Chenu, 1844) = Eualetes tulipa (Rousseau in Chenu, 1843)
 Thylacodes caperatus (Tate & May, 1900) = Petaloconchus caperatus (Tate & May, 1900)
 Thylacodes dentiferus (Mörch, 1859) = Thylacodes longifilis (Mörch, 1862)
 Thylacodes effusus (Valenciennes in Chenu, 1844) = Eualetes tulipa (Rousseau in Chenu, 1843)
 Thylacodes oryzata (Mörch, 1862) = Thylacodes oryzatus (Mörch, 1862)

References

External links
 Sasso, A. (1827). Saggio geologico sopra il Bacino terziario di Albenga. Giornale Ligustico di Scienze, Lettere ed Arti, 1(5): 467–484
 Carpenter, P. P. (1857). Monograph of the shells collected by T. Nuttall, Esq., on the California coast, in the years 1834–5. Proceedings of the Zoological Society of London. (1856) 24: 209-220
 http://www-gdz.sub.uni-goettingen.de/cgi-bin/digbib.cgi?PPN483932760
 Blainville, H. M. D. de. (1828). Tulaxode, Tulaxoda. p. 40. in: Dictionnaire des Sciences Naturelles (F. Cuvier, ed.), vol. 56. Levrault, Strasbourg & Paris, & Le Normant, Paris
 Gray, J. E. (1850). [text. In: Gray, M. E., Figures of molluscous animals, selected from various authors. Longman, Brown, Green and Longmans, London. Vol. 4, iv + 219 pp. (August) [Frontispiece (portrait of Mrs. Gray); pp. ii–iv (preface); 1–62 (explanation of plates 1–312 in Volumes 1–3); pp. 63–124 (systematic arrangement of figures); 127–219 (reprint of Gray 1847)]
 Mörch, O. A. L. (1859). Étude sur la famille des vermets. Journal de Conchyliologie. 7: 342-360

Vermetidae